The Ontario Association of Former Parliamentarians (OAFP) is a non-profit volunteer organization created to serve former Members of the Ontario Legislative Assembly.

Established by an act of the legislature in 2000, the objectives of the association are:

 to put the knowledge and experience of its members at the service of parliamentary democracy in Ontario and elsewhere
 to serve the public interest by providing non-partisan support for the parliamentary system of government in Ontario
 to foster a spirit of community among former parliamentarians
 to foster good relations between members of the Legislative Assembly of the Province of Ontario and former parliamentarians
 to protect and promote the interests of former parliamentarians

The association is strictly non-partisan and has former members from all three political parties serving on its board of directors.

Activities
The association publishes a quarterly newsletter, The InFormer.

It is developing a variety of educational tools to assist in advancing awareness of the parliamentary form of government. It also acts as a central clearing house for former members seeking information from various departments of the Legislative Assembly.

The association has formed a relationship with similar groups of former parliamentarians in Quebec and Manitoba and, ultimately, is working towards the development of a global association of former members of state or provincial governments.

Leadership
The Board of Directors in 2012 included:

References

External links
Ontario Association of Former Parliamentarians (OAFP)
The InFormer

Organizations based in Ontario